Dickinson Wright PLLC is a law firm based in Detroit, Michigan. With over 475 lawyers across more than 40 practices and industries, Dickinson Wright serves clients from nineteen offices, six of which are in Michigan. According to the National Law Journal's 2022 NLJ 500 ranking of firms based on size, Dickinson Wright is ranked 102 in the United States.

History
Dickinson Wright was founded in 1878 by two young lawyers, Henry Munroe Campbell and Henry Russel.

Members of the firm were involved in drafting the state of Michigan's two constitutions in 1908 and 1963. After President Franklin Delano Roosevelt closed banks nationwide during the banking crisis of 1933, the firm helped organize the new federally-funded National Bank of Detroit (now JPMorgan Chase & Co.) that helped stabilize the state’s banking system and end a 36-day bank holiday.

The firm began expanding outside of Michigan in 1978 with the opening of the firm's Washington, D.C. office. Since then, the firm has added five additional offices in Michigan (Ann Arbor, Grand Rapids, Lansing, Saginaw, and Troy). In the late 2000s, the firm added offices in Toronto, Phoenix, and Nashville. The firm expanded the Toronto office in 2011, the Phoenix office in 2013, and the Las Vegas (NV) office in 2015. The firm opened new offices in Columbus (OH) in 2012 and Lexington (KY) in 2015. Fort Lauderdale (FL) and Austin (TX) offices were added in 2016. The El Paso (TX) office opened in July 2017, and the Silicon Valley office in 2018. In January 1, 2021, the firm opened a Chicago office with the acquisition of Stahl Cowen Crowley Addis LLC.

Around the late 1980s and early 1990s, because of the increase in Japanese companies in Metro Detroit, Dickinson, Wright, Moon, Van Dusen & Freeman hired a Japanese paralegal and two Japanese lawyers. With its new employees it began publishing a Japanese-language newsletter for Japanese clients and began conducting Japanese-language seminars.

The firm adopted its current name, Dickinson Wright PLLC, when it established itself as a professional limited liability company in January 1998.

Practice areas
Dickinson Wright maintains a diverse range of practice areas, including administrative & regulatory, anti-trust & trade regulation, appellate, automotive, automotive litigation, banking & financial services, bankruptcy, business technology, Canadian & U.S. Litigation Differences, construction, corporate, corporate finance, cyber security, data privacy, emerging business, employee benefits, energy & sustainability, environmental, estate planning & administration, family law, gaming, government relations, healthcare, hospitality, immigration, Native American law, insurance, intellectual property, labor & employment, litigation, media, sports & entertainment, mergers & acquisitions, municipal law & finance, patent litigation, private equity, products liability, real estate, schools & education, securities, taxation and transportation.

Offices

Current
Detroit, Michigan (1878)
The firm's headquarters are in One Detroit Center in Downtown Detroit. The company moved into the building when it opened in 1992. In 2007 the company had almost  of space in the building. That year it renewed its lease.
Troy, Michigan (1966)
Relocated from Birmingham to Bloomfield Hills in 1972, and from Bloomfield Hills to Troy in 2011.
Lansing, Michigan (1970)
Washington, D.C. (1978)
Grand Rapids, Michigan (1989)
Ann Arbor, Michigan (2000)
Toronto, Ontario (2008)
Expanded through a combination with Aylesworth LLP in 2011.
Nashville, Tennessee (2009)
Opened through a combination with Stewart Estes & Donnell PLC.
Phoenix, Arizona (2009)
Expanded through a combination with Mariscal, Weeks, McIntyre & Friedlander, P.A. in 2013.
Las Vegas, Nevada (2010)
Columbus, Ohio (2012)
Saginaw, Michigan (2012)
Lexington, Kentucky (2015)
Reno, Nevada (2015)
Ft. Lauderdale, Florida (2016)
Austin, Texas (2016)
El Paso, Texas (2017)
Sunnyvale, California (2018)

Chicago, Illinois (2021)

Notable lawyers and alumni
Kerry B. Harvey, former U. S. Attorney for the Eastern District of Kentucky, is a Member, Lexington office.
Dennis Archer, former mayor of Detroit, current Chairman Emeritus, Detroit office.
Vivian Bercovici, former Canadian ambassador to Israel.
Mary Beth Kelly, former Justice on the Michigan Supreme Court.
Susan Bieke Neilson, former judge on the United States Court of Appeals for the Sixth Circuit, former partner.
John Corbett O'Meara, current federal judge of the United States District Court for the Eastern District of Michigan.
Spencer Overton, professor at George Washington University Law School, scholar of election law.
Henry Saad, current judge of the Michigan Court of Appeals, former partner.
David Viviano, current Justice on the Michigan Supreme Court.
Gretchen Whitmer, former Michigan State Senator (D-East Lansing), current Governor of Michigan.
Brian K. Zahra, current Justice on the Michigan Supreme Court.

Accolades
Chambers – Chambers & Partners ranked the firm in 2020’s edition of Chambers USA: America’s Leading Lawyers for Business in the areas of Banking & Finance, Bankruptcy & Restructuring, Corporate/M&A, Employee Benefits & Executive Compensation, Gaming & Licensing, General Commercial Litigation, Immigration, Intellectual Property, Labor & Employment, Media & Entertainment, and Real Estate.
Best Law Firms – U.S. News-Best Lawyers® Named Dickinson Wright a Tier 1 National “Best Law Firm” in the areas of Commercial Litigation, Construction Law, Real Estate Litigation, and Tax Law in 2019 in addition to giving 116 additional First Tier regional rankings in the various practice areas throughout the country.
Corporate Equality Index (CEI) – Dickinson Wright received a perfect score on the 2022 Human Rights Campaign (HRC) Corporate Equality Index (CEI). The firm also received perfect scores from 2018–2021.

References
 Ingrassia, Paul and Joseph B. White. Comeback: The Fall & Rise of the American Automobile Industry. Simon & Schuster, May 14, 2013. , 9781476737478.

Notes

External links

 Homepage
 Chambers USA profile
 Firm profile from LexisNexis Martindale-Hubbell
 Organizational Profile at the National Law Review

Law firms established in 1878
Law firms based in Detroit
1878 establishments in Michigan